Cornelius is a city in Washington County, Oregon, United States. Located in the Portland metropolitan area, the city's population was 11,869  at the 2010 census. The city lies along Tualatin Valley Highway between Forest Grove to the west and Hillsboro to the east. Cornelius was incorporated in 1893 and is named for founder Thomas R. Cornelius.

History
In 1845, Benjamin Cornelius immigrated to Oregon with his family, traveling with Joseph Meek. The Cornelius family settled on the Tualatin Plains, near what is now North Plains. The same year, Benjamin Q. Tucker and Solomon Emerick staked land claims and established farms on the land that would eventually become Cornelius.

In 1871, Benjamin Cornelius's son Colonel Thomas R. Cornelius learned that Ben Holladay planned to extend the Oregon and California Railroad right through Free Orchards.  Holladay had been told by Forest Grove and Hillsboro that they would not allow the railroad free right-of-way, so Holladay planned to bypass them, and build Free Orchards into a new city that would become the new county seat of Washington County.

The new railroad was approaching Free Orchards in 1871, and Cornelius saw an opportunity to benefit from the new railroad.  He left his farm and built a new house, a warehouse, and a store in Free Orchards.  The warehouse and store were located right next to the railroad, and so became natural places for local farmers to trade and store their goods.  Cornelius also built a creamery to process milk, and two sawmills to supply lumber for the growing community.  In addition, he helped to build the first frame schoolhouse and the Methodist Church.

In 1893, Free Orchards was incorporated and renamed "Cornelius", to honor the man who spent many years helping build the community.  Though Holladay's plan to make Free Orchards into the county seat never materialized, Cornelius survives today as an agricultural town and, increasingly, as a suburb of Portland. The Cornelius Public Library was founded in 1912.

Geography

Demographics

2010 census
As of the census of 2010, there were 11,869 people, 3,339 households, and 2,666 families living in the city. The racial makeup of the city was 64.0% White, 1.2% African American, 1.3% Native American, 2.2% Asian, 0.1% Pacific Islander, 27.2% from other races, and 4.0% from two or more races. Hispanic or Latino of any race were 50.1% of the population.

There were 3,339 households, of which 51.8% had children under the age of 18 living with them, 62.1% were married couples living together, 10.5% had a female householder with no husband present, 7.3% had a male householder with no wife present, and 20.2% were non-families. 14.1% of all households were made up of individuals, and 5.1% had someone living alone who was 65 years of age or older. The average household size was 3.51 and the average family size was 3.88.

The median age in the city was 30.4 years. 32.9% of residents were under the age of 18; 9.8% were between the ages of 18 and 24; 30.6% were from 25 to 44; 20.5% were from 45 to 64; and 6.3% were 65 years of age or older. The gender makeup of the city was 51.1% male and 48.9% female.

2000 census
As of the census of 2000, there were 9,652 people, 2,880 households, and 2,246 families living in the city. The population density was 5,095.9 people per square mile (1,971.8/km2). There were 3,003 housing units at an average density of 1,585.5 per square mile (613.5/km2). The racial makeup of the city was 37.39% White, 0.76% African American, 1.24% Native American, 1.04% Asian, 0.28% Pacific Islander, 24.32% from other races, and 3.76% from two or more races. Hispanic or Latino of any race were 68.61% of the population.

There were 2,880 households, out of which 45.3% had children under the age of 18 living with them, 61.8% were married couples living together, 10.4% had a female householder with no husband present, and 22.0% were non-families. 15.9% of all households were made up of individuals, and 5.4% had someone living alone who was 65 years of age or older. The average household size was 3.31 and the average family size was 3.64.

In the city, the population was spread out, with 32.5% under the age of 18, 11.0% from 18 to 24, 33.6% from 25 to 44, 16.9% from 45 to 64, and 6.1% who were 65 years of age or older. The median age was 29 years. For every 100 females, there were 108.1 males. For every 100 females age 18 and over, there were 107.0 males.

The median income for a household in the city was $45,959, and the median income for a family was $49,456. Males had a median income of $32,164 versus $25,207 for females. The per capita income for the city was $15,290. About 10.8% of families and 16.1% of the population were below the poverty line, including 17.6% of those under age 18 and 10.5% of those age 65 or over.

Government
Police services are contracted through the Washington County Sheriff's Office.

Politics

Since 2008, Cornelius has favored the Democratic Party, in line with Washington County as a whole. Previously, it was more competitive; in 2000, Democrat Al Gore won the city by just two votes and in 2004 it voted for Republican President George W. Bush. Since Barack Obama's 2008 victory, Democrats have consistently won Cornelius by double digits.

Education
In 1851, the Cornelius Elementary School District 2 was founded. The Cornelius district was dissolved in 1960, with the western parts of the enrollment area going to the Forest Grove district and the eastern part going to the Hillsboro districts.

There are few private schools in the Cornelius area. Swallowtail School moved from Hillsboro in July 2016, occupying the former Emmaus Christian School building.

Transportation
Cornelius is within the TriMet district, and public transit service is provided by TriMet's bus line 57-TV Highway, which operates seven days a week.  Line 57 connects the city with Forest Grove, to the west, and with Hillsboro and Beaverton to the east, via the Tualatin Valley Highway (known by locals as "TV Highway").  It also links Cornelius with the Portland region's light rail system (MAX) in Hillsboro.

The airport serving Cornelius is Skyport Airport.

See also
Virginia Garcia Memorial Health Center

References

External links
 
 Entry for Cornelius in the Oregon Blue Book

 
Cities in Oregon
Cities in Washington County, Oregon
Portland metropolitan area
1893 establishments in Oregon
Populated places established in 1893